The Turya is a river in Sverdlovsk Oblast, Russia. It is a right tributary of the Sosva.

The river has its sources in the boggy regions east of the central Ural Mountains. It freezes over in late October, and stays frozen until late April or early May. Along the Turya lie the towns of Krasnoturyinsk and Karpinsk.

In 1943 a dam was built across the river at Krasnoturyinsk. Later, more dams were built upstream.

The river is polluted as a result of nearby industries, like the Bogoslovsky Aluminium Plant, a chicken factory, and a power plant, in addition to runoff from the towns of Krasnoturyinsk and Karpinsk.

References

External links 
 A study of pollution i Turya River (Russian)

Rivers of Sverdlovsk Oblast